The Trials of Jimmy Rose is a British crime drama television miniseries, starring Ray Winstone as protagonist Jimmy Rose, an ex-convict and businessman who tries to go straight after being released from prison on licence. The series also stars Amanda Redman, John Lynch and Paul Jesson as Jimmy's wife, her lover and his brother, respectively. The series premiered on 30 August 2015. The DVD of the first series was released on 14 September 2015.

Plot
Jimmy Rose (Ray Winstone), a long-term convict and criminal, is released on parole after serving twelve years in prison for armed robbery. When he returns home, he finds his wife, Jackie (Amanda Redman) is co-habiting with another man; his son, Joe (Tom Cullen) refuses to even speak to him; and his grand-daughter, Ellie (Montanna Thompson), has become addicted to drugs and is now working as a courier for gangland criminals Mehmet Guzman and Tony Chivers. Jimmy decides to turn his back on going straight to save his granddaughter from the clutches of the evil world of drugs, whilst trying to rebuild his family at the same time.

Cast
 Ray Winstone as Jimmy Rose, a former convict who is out on parole licence after serving twelve years for armed robbery
 Amanda Redman as Jackie Rose, Jimmy's long-suffering wife
 John Lynch as DI Steve McIntyre, Jackie's lover who convinces Jimmy to turn informant
 Paul Jesson as Roy Anderson, Jimmy's brother
 Marion Bailey as Sue Anderson, Roy's wife and Jimmy's sister-in-law
 Tom Cullen as Joe Rose, Jimmy's estranged son who refuses to have anything to do with him
 Leticia Dolera as Maria Rose, Joe's wife
 Pippa Bennett-Warner as Kerry Irwin, Jimmy's probation officer
 Montanna Thompson as Ellie Rose, Jimmy's drug-addicted granddaughter
 Mel Raido as Tony Chivers, gangland associate and drug dealer
 Akin Gazi as Mehmet Guzman, gangland associate and drug dealer

Episode list

References

External links
 

2010s British crime drama television series
2010s British television miniseries
2015 British television series debuts
2015 British television series endings
English-language television shows
ITV miniseries
Serial drama television series
Television series by ITV Studios